Hasib may refer to:
 Hasib (name)
 Names of God in Islam

Names of God in Islam